Tosca Bucarelli Martini (4 October 1922 – 10 January 2000) was an Italian Partisan and politician from Florence. During the Italian Civil War, she joined the Gruppi di Azione Patriottica (GAP), a Communist Partisan organization resisting Mussolini's Fascist Italian Social Republic. She later served as City Councillor for Florence from 1975 to 1980.

Partisan activity 
On February 8th, 1944, Bucarelli and her GAP comrade Antonio Ignesti attempted to bomb the Bar Paskowski, frequented by Fascist Party members and Nazi soldiers. However, the fuse malfunctioned, and their cover was blown. Ingesti managed to escape, but Bucarelli was captured and subjected to torture by Mario Carità's forces. She was later taken to the Villa Triste, and later to the Santa Verdiana monastery where other anti-fascists were being held.

On July 9th, 1944, she was rescued alongside 16 others from Santa Verdiana by a GAP team led by Bruno Fanciullacci and Elio Chianesi. During her captivity and as a result of Carità's infamous torture methods, she suffered liver damage which would impact her health for the rest of her life. In fact, both Fanciullacci and Chianesi would be captured and tortured by Carità at Villa Triste less than a week later, with Chianesi dying under torture and Fanciullacci dying during an escape attempt.

Post-war 
On October 16, 1944, Bucarelli married fellow Partisan Roberto Martini. She would have two children by him: Mario in 1953 and Margherita in 1955. After the war, Roberto Martini became mayor of the small Tuscan town of Scandicci from April 1947 until June 1951. She appeared in Liliana Cavani's 1965 film Women of the Resistance. Bucarelli herself served as City Councillor of the city of Florence from 1975 to 1980 as a member of the Italian Communist Party. She donated her husband's papers to the city archive in 1995.

References  

1922 births
2000 deaths
Italian partisans
Italian politicians
Italian Marxists
Italian resistance movement members
People from Florence

it:Tosca Bucarelli